Lester F. Brinkley (born May 13, 1965 – July 7, 2002) was an American football defensive end in the National Football League for the Dallas Cowboys for the 1990 NFL season.  He played college football at the University of Mississippi.

1965 births
2002 deaths
People from Ruleville, Mississippi
American football defensive ends
Ole Miss Rebels football players
Dallas Cowboys players
Iowa Barnstormers players